Apollo Musagetes  may refer to:
Apollo (ballet)
an epithet of Apollo

Epithets of Apollo